Bangladesh competed at the 2018 Commonwealth Games in the Gold Coast, Australia from April 4 to April 15, 2018. It was Bangladesh's 9th appearance at the Commonwealth Games.

Sport shooter Abdullah Hel Baki was the country's flag bearer during the opening ceremony.

Medalists

Competitors
The following is the list of number of competitors participating at the Games per sport/discipline.

Athletics

Bangladesh participated with 2 athletes (1 man and 1 woman).

Track & road events

Shooting

Bangladesh participated with 12 athletes (6 men and 6 women).

Men

Women

Swimming

Bangladesh participated with 3 athletes (2 men and 1 woman).

Men

Women

Weightlifting

Bangladesh participated with five athletes (one man and four women).

Wrestling

Bangladesh participated with 2 athletes (1 man and 1 woman).

Men

Women

See also
Bangladesh at the 2018 Summer Youth Olympics

References

Nations at the 2018 Commonwealth Games
Bangladesh at the Commonwealth Games
2018 in Bangladeshi sport